Jewish architecture comprises the architecture of Jewish religious buildings and other buildings that either incorporate Jewish elements in their design or are used by Jewish communities.

Terminology 
Due to the diasporic nature of Jewish history, there is no single architectural style that is common across all Jewish cultures. Examples of buildings considered Jewish architecture include explicitly religious buildings such as synagogues and mikvehs, as well as Jewish schools.

See also 

 Synagogue architecture
 List of Jewish architects
 Jewish Architectural Heritage Foundation
 Sacral architecture

References 

Architectural styles
Jewish culture